Paraneurachne is a genus of Australian plants in the grass family. The only known species is Paraneurachne muelleri native to Western Australia, South Australia, Northern Territory, and Queensland.

References

External links
 Grassbase - The World Online Grass Flora

Panicoideae
Monotypic Poaceae genera
Endemic flora of Australia
Taxa named by Eduard Hackel